Ibon Urbieta Zubiria (born 30 April 1967) is a Spanish rower. He competed at the 1988 Summer Olympics and the 1992 Summer Olympics.

References

1967 births
Living people
Spanish male rowers
Olympic rowers of Spain
Rowers at the 1988 Summer Olympics
Rowers at the 1992 Summer Olympics
People from Urola Kosta
Sportspeople from Gipuzkoa
Rowers from the Basque Country (autonomous community)